Bruno Finzi (born 13 January 1899 – 10 September 1974) was an Italian mathematician, engineer and physicist.

Biography
Born at Gardone Val Trompia, Finzi received in 1920 his Laurea (MSE) as an engineer and in 1921 as a mathematician at the University of Pavia. In 1922 he became an assistant of Umberto Cisotti at the Polytecnico di Milano. In 1931 he became a professor of rational mechanics at the University of Milan, but returned in 1947 to the Polytecnico di Milano as the successor to Cisotti and became there director of the Mathematical Institute. From 1949 he was the head of the newly founded Institute of Aeronautics and in 1967 he became the rector of the Polytecnico.

His research dealt with various areas of mathematical physics, in particular with hydrodynamics, aerodynamics, elasticity theory and other areas of continuum mechanics, and the theories of special and general relativity.

Finzi was an Invited Speaker at the ICM in 1928 in Bologna and in 1932 in Zürich. In 1956 he received the Feltrinelli Prize from the Accademia dei Lincei and in 1933 the Kramer Prize from the Istituto Lombardo. He was elected a member of the Accademia dei Lincei. From 1965 to 1969 he was the president of the Associazone Italiana di Meccanica Teorica e Applicata (AIMETA).

He died at Milan in 1974.

Selected publications
 with Gino Bozza: Resistenza idro ed aerodinamica, Milan 1935
 Meccanica razionale, Bologna 1946
 with Maria Pastori: Calcolo tensoriale e applicazioni, Bologna 1949
 Lezioni di aerodinamica, Milan 1953

References

External links
 Enciclopdia Treccani, Roberto Maiocchi, Dizionario Biografico degli Italiani 1997
 biography of Bruno Finzi at Pristem website  

20th-century Italian mathematicians
20th-century Italian engineers
Members of the Lincean Academy
Scientists from Brescia
1899 births
1974 deaths
Engineers from Brescia